The Rupie was the currency of German East Africa between 1890 and 1916, continuing to circulate in the Tanganyika Territory until 1920.

History
The Indian rupee was the dominant currency used along the East African coast during the second half of the 19th century where it had marginalized the American gold dollar and the Maria Theresa thaler. The German East Africa Company acquired rights to mint coinage in 1890 and issued rupies which were equivalent to the Indian and Zanzibar rupee. The Company retained its coinage rights even after the takeover of German East Africa by the government later in 1890. In 1904 the German government took over currency matters and established the Ostafrikanische Bank.

The Rupie was initially equivalent to the Indian rupee. Until 1904, it was subdivided into 64 Pesa (equivalent to the Indian pice or paisa). The currency was decimalized on 28 February 1904, with 1 Rupie = 100 Heller, which was then adapted into the Swahili language as the word 'hela' which is still in use today meaning 'money'. At the same time, a fixed exchange rate of 15 Rupien = 20 German Mark was established.

In 1915 and 1916 in the period of fighting in East Africa during World War I a large series of emergency issues of paper money were issued. 1916 also saw a final issue of coins to pay German led troops, including 15 Rupien coins which contained an equivalent amount of gold from the Sekenke Gold Mine to equal 15 German Marks.  Later in 1916 German East Africa was occupied by British and Belgian forces. In Tanganyika, the Rupie circulated alongside the East African rupee (to which it was equal) until 1920, when both were replaced by the East African florin at par. In Burundi and Rwanda, the Belgian Congolese franc replaced the Rupie in 1916.

Coins
In 1890, copper 1 Pesa and silver 1 and 2 Rupie coins were introduced, followed the next year by silver  and  Rupie and in 1893 by silver 2 Rupien coins. The silver coins were minted to the same standard as the Indian rupee.

As a consequence of decimalization, bronze  and 1 Heller were introduced in 1904, followed by bronze 5 Heller and holed, cupro-nickel 10 Heller in 1908. In 1913, holed, cupro-nickel 5 Heller were introduced.

The 1916 issues were minted at Tabora as a wartime emergency coinage.  A total of 302,940 brass 5 Heller were issued.  In addition, both copper (325,000) and brass (1,307,760) 20 Heller coins were produced, a quantity that allows them to remain readily available for collectors.  In addition 16,198 of the gold 15 Rupien mentioned above were produced.  While the smaller valued coins were crudely struck, the gold pieces received fine detail.

Banknotes
In 1905, the Deutsch-Ostafrikanische Bank introduced notes for 5, 10, 50, and 100 Rupien, and 500 Rupien in 1912. Between 1915 and 1917, World War I emergency issue (interim) notes were produced in denominations of 1, 5, 10, 20, 50 and 200 Rupien.

Emergency issue (provisional banknotes)
Colonial German East Africa was cut off from Germany resulting from a wartime blockade. Silver coinage was hoarded for its intrinsic value in commercial transactions, and the colonial government was pressured into creating interim banknotes. Previous issues of banknotes (i.e., 1905 and 1912) were produced  by the German printing company Giesecke & Devrient. The colonial government contracted with the printers of Deutsch-Ostafrikanische Zeitung, a daily newspaper in Dar es Salaam, and on 15 March 1915 they produced the first issue of provisional notes (20 rupien), initially printed on linen and later on paper made from jute. Given the wartime supply shortages, the provisional notes were also printed on commercial paper, wrapping paper, and in one very rare instance, wall paper. Initially variations of white, the notes also appeared in a wide variety of colors, including blue-gray, olive brown, reddish brown, golden brown, dark brown, gray brown, shades of blue, and dark green.

The translated text of the notes states: (front) Provisional Banknote. The German East African Bank will pay, without checking a person’s identity, one rupie (etc.) from its offices in the D.O.A. protectorate.
and, in both German and Swahili: (reverse) One hundred percent of the face value of this banknote is deposited with the Imperial German East African government. A warning on the lower reverse of the note states that counterfeiting will result in a minimum sentence of two years at hard labor. Treasury records from colonial German East Africa indicate that 8,876,741 interim notes were printed.

References

Notes

External links

Currencies of Africa
Economy of German East Africa
Modern obsolete currencies
Currencies of Germany
1890 establishments in German East Africa
1916 disestablishments in German East Africa